Stenoptilodes hypsipora is a moth of the family Pterophoridae that is known from Peru.

Adults are on wing in July.

External links

hypsipora
Moths described in 1916
Endemic fauna of Peru
Moths of South America